Julián Esteban Zea Macca (born 17 January 1999) is a Colombian footballer who plays as a forward.

Club career

Deportivo Cali
Zea joined Deportivo Cali when he was 8 years old. He played his way up through the youth ranks and got his professional debut against La Equidad on 30 August 2018 in a cup game, where he played from start. His Categoría Primera A debut came nearly two months later against Jaguares de Córdoba. Those two games was his only appearances in that season.

Zea signed a new three-year deal with Cali in January 2019. However, Zea only played a total of 63 minutes, divided into 2 matches, in the whole 2019 season.

Tauro
In the summer 2019, Zea and two other Colombian players from Deportivo Cali, together joined Tauro F.C. in Panama. Zea quickly became a regular player for the team, playing 23 games and scoring two goals in six months, helping the team winning the league title in that season.

Alianza Petrolera
In February 2020, Zea returned to Colombia and joined Alianza Petrolera. He got his debut a week later against La Equidad. He left the club at the end of June 2022.

References

External links
 

Living people
1999 births
Association football forwards
Colombian footballers
Colombian expatriate footballers
Categoría Primera A players
Liga Panameña de Fútbol players
Deportivo Cali footballers
Tauro F.C. players
Alianza Petrolera players
Footballers from Cali
Colombian expatriate sportspeople in Panama
Expatriate footballers in Panama